I'm Only Dancing (The Soul Tour 74) is a live album by English musician David Bowie. It had a limited release on 29 August 2020 for Record Store Day as a double LP and double CD. It was recorded on the second half of the Diamond Dogs Tour in 1974, which is known as "the Soul Tour" due to the influence of the then-unreleased material Bowie had begun recording for Young Americans (1975). I'm Only Dancing marks the first time performances from this portion of the tour have been officially released.

Background
David Bowie supported his eighth studio album Diamond Dogs on the Diamond Dogs Tour, the first leg of which lasted from 14 June to 20 July 1974. Co-designed and constructed by Chris Langhart, the tour featured elaborate set-pieces and cost $250,000. Films that influenced the design included Fritz Lang's Metropolis (1927) and Robert Wiene's The Cabinet of Dr. Caligari (1920). The second leg of the tour, lasting 2 September to 1 December 1974, has been nicknamed "the Soul Tour", due to the influence of the soul music Bowie had begun recording for Young Americans in August. Because of this, the shows were heavily altered, no longer featuring elaborate set-pieces, partly due to Bowie's exhaustion with the design and wanting to explore the new sound he was creating. The tour's lineup was also revamped to feature musicians who had recorded for Young Americans. Songs from the previous leg were dropped, while new ones (some from Young Americans) were added. Performances from the tour were previously released on two live albums, David Live and Cracked Actor (Live Los Angeles '74), which were released in 1974 and 2017, respectively. However, I'm Only Dancing (The Soul Tour 74) marks the first time performances from the "Soul" portion of the tour have been officially released.

Recording
The majority of I'm Only Dancing (The Soul Tour 74) was recorded on 20 October 1974 at the Michigan Palace in Detroit, Michigan, while three tracks, including "Knock on Wood" and the medlies of "Footstompin'" / "I Wish I Could Shimmy Like My Sister Kate" / "Footstompin'" and "Diamond Dogs" / "It's Only Rock 'n Roll (But I Like It)" / "Diamond Dogs" were recorded on 30 November 1974 at the Municipal Auditorium in Nashville, Tennessee. According to Rolling Stone, the cover artwork mirrors the original design for the programs on the two recording dates.

Track listing

Vinyl release

CD release

Recorded at the Michigan Palace, Detroit on 20 October 1974.
Tracks marked with * recorded at the Municipal Auditorium, Nashville on 30 November 1974.

Personnel
Per davidbowie.com.
 David Bowie – vocals, 12-string acoustic guitar, harmonica
 Earl Slick – guitar
 Carlos Alomar – guitar
 Mike Garson – piano, Mellotron
 David Sanborn – alto saxophone, flute
 Pablo Rosario – percussion
 Emir Ksasan – bass
 Dennis Davis – drums
 Warren Peace – backing vocals
 Anthony Hinton – backing vocals
 Luther Vandross – backing vocals
 Ava Cherry – backing vocals
 Robin Clark – backing vocals
 Diane Sumler – backing vocals

Charts

References

External links
 I'm Only Dancing (The Soul Tour 74) at Discogs

David Bowie live albums
Parlophone live albums
2020 live albums